Norwich Cathedral is an Anglican cathedral in Norwich, Norfolk, dedicated to the Holy and Undivided Trinity. It is the cathedral church for the Church of England Diocese of Norwich and is one of the Norwich 12 heritage sites.

The cathedral was begun in 1096 and constructed out of flint and mortar and faced with a cream-coloured Caen limestone. An Anglo-Saxon settlement and two churches were demolished to make room for the buildings. The cathedral was completed in 1145 with the Norman tower still seen today topped with a wooden spire covered with lead. Episodes of damage necessitated rebuilding and the stone spire was erected in 1480. The bosses of Norwich Cathedral are one of the world's greatest mediaeval sculptural treasures that survived the iconoclasm of the Tudor and English Civil War periods.The bosses in the cloisters include hundreds that are carved and ornately painted.

Norwich Cathedral has the second largest cloisters in England, only exceeded by those at Salisbury Cathedral. The cathedral close is one of the largest in Europe and has more people living within it than any other close. It once had the earliest astronomical clock in England.

History

Origins
In the year 672, the Archbishop of Canterbury, Theodore of Tarsus, divided the Kingdom of East Anglia into two dioceses: one covering Norfolk with its episcopal see at Elmham; the other covering Suffolk with its see at Dunwich. During much of the 9th century, because of the Danish incursions, there was no bishop at Elmham; in addition the see of Dunwich was extinguished and East Anglia became a single diocese once more. Following the Norman Conquest, sees were moved to more secure urban centres, that of Elmham being transferred to Thetford in 1072, and finally to Norwich in 1094. The new cathedral, dedicated to the Holy and Undivided Trinity, incorporated a priory of Benedictine monks.

Norman period
The structure of the cathedral is primarily in the Norman style, having been constructed at the behest of the first bishop of Norwich, Herbert de Losinga, who had bought the bishopric for £1,900 before its transfer from Thetford. Building started in 1096 and the cathedral was completed between 1121 and 1145. It was built from flint and mortar and faced with cream-coloured Caen limestone. It still retains the greater part of its original stone structure. An Anglo-Saxon settlement and two churches were demolished to make room for the buildings and a canal cut to allow access for the boats bringing the stone and building materials which were taken up the River Wensum and unloaded.

The ground plan remains entirely as it was in Norman times, except for that of the easternmost chapel. The cathedral has an unusually long nave of 14 bays. The transepts are without aisles and the east end terminates in an apse with an ambulatory. From the ambulatory there is access to two chapels of unusual shape, the plan of each being based on two intersecting circles. This allows more correct orientation of the altars than in the more normal kind of radial chapel.

The crossing tower was the last piece of the Norman cathedral to be completed, in around 1140. It is boldly decorated with circles, lozenges and interlaced arcading. The present spire, a stone structure that replaced one made of wood and covered with lead, was added in1480.

Later Medieval period

The cathedral was damaged after riots in 1272, which resulted in the city paying heavy fines levied by Henry III, king of England Rebuilding was completed in 1278 and the cathedral was re-consecrated in the presence of Edward I of England on Advent Sunday of that year.

Norwich Cathedral has the second largest cloisters in England, only exceeded by those at Salisbury Cathedral. It has two-storeys, the only example of its kind in England and nearly 400 carved stone ceiling bosses. It was begun in 1297 and finally finished in 1430 after the Black Death had plagued the city. The system of building remained the same over this period, though the details, in particular the tracery of the openings facing the cloister garth, did change.

The Norman spire was blown down in 1362. Its fall damaged the east end of the building, and the clerestory of the choir was rebuilt in the Perpendicular style. In the 15th and early 16th centuries, the cathedral's flat timber ceilings were replaced with stone vaults: the nave was vaulted under Walter Hart (bishop, 1446–1472), the choir and the Bauchun Chapel (on the east side of the south transept) under James Goldwell (bishop, 1472–1499) and the transepts after 1520. The system of vaulting is of a tierceron vault with Lierne ribs forming patterns of lozenges and stars along the ridge. The vaulting was carried out in a spectacular manner with hundreds of ornately carved, painted and gilded bosses studding the liernes.

The bosses of Norwich Cathedral are one of the world's greatest mediaeval sculptural treasures, and certainly a near miraculous survival of the iconoclasm from the Tudor and English Civil War periods. They have been described by the church historian Charles John Philip Cave as "undoubtedly the most important series in the country". There are over 1,000 bosses; the earliest subjects are natural, mostly flowers and foliage. Then come figural representations such as green men, acrobats, mythical animals, hunting scenes and single bosses which show a story such as events from the lives of the saints. Then there are narratives which tell a story in a sequence of bosses. The nave vault shows the history of the world from the creation. Later bosses revert to foliage or formal subjects such as coats of arms. The bosses can be seen most clearly in the cloisters, where they are lower than those elsewhere. The east range has much foliage, and a sequence of the Passion of Jesus.  The north range has the Resurrection and scenes of Mary, mother of Jesus and the saints. The south and west walk have the Apocalypse, as well as the Annunciation and Herod's Feast. Catalogues of the cloister bosses have been published by M.R. James (1911), with drawings of the bosses of the north walk.

In 1463 the spire was struck by lightning, causing a fire to rage through the nave which was so intense it turned some of the cream-coloured Caen limestone a pink colour. In 1480 the bishop, James Goldwell, ordered the building of a new spire which is still in place today. It is of brick faced with stone, supported on brick squinches built into the Norman tower.

The Anglican cathedrals at Norwich, Salisbury, and Ely are the only ones that have no ring of bells. One of the best views of the cathedral spire is from St James's Hill on Mousehold Heath. The original clock at Norwich Cathedral was one of the earliest mechanical timekeepers made in Britain.

16th and 17th centuries

The composer and 'singing man' Osbert Parsley worked at Norwich Cathedral for 50 years, until his death in 1585.

The cathedral was partially in ruins when John Cosin was at Norwich School in the early 17th century and the former bishop was an absentee figure. In 1643 during the Civil War, an angry Puritan mob invaded the cathedral and destroyed all Roman Catholic symbols. The building, abandoned the following year, lay in ruins for two decades. Norwich bishop Joseph Hall provides a graphic description from his book Hard Measure:

The mob also fired their muskets. At least one musket ball remains lodged in the stonework. Only at the Restoration in 1660 would the cathedral be restored.

19th and 20th centuries

In about 1830 the south transept was remodelled by Anthony Salvin. In 1930–1932 a new Lady Chapel, designed by Charles Nicholson, was built at the east end, on the site of its 13th-century predecessor, which had been demolished during the late 16th century. The cathedral is one of the Norwich 12 heritage sites.

Modern works
In 2004 the new refectory (winner, National Wood Awards 2004), by Hopkins Architects and Buro Happold, opened on the site of the original refectory on the south side of the cloisters. Work on the new hostry, also by Hopkins Architects, started in April 2007 after the 'Cathedral Inspiration for the Future Campaign' had reached its target of £10 million. It was opened by the Queen and the Duke of Edinburgh on 4 May 2010. The new hostry has become the main entrance to the cathedral. Space has been provided within the hostry for temporary art exhibitions.

Helter-skelter 
Reaction to the installation of the slide was mixed, Gavin Ashenden, former chaplain to the Queen, described it as "poisoning the medicine" a church offered. In August 2019, Jonathan Meyrick, the Bishop of Lynn, gave a sermon and sang Words by the Bee Gees from halfway down.

Ministry

Dean and chapter
As of 3 February 2023:
Dean of Norwich – Andrew Braddock (since 28 January 2023 institution)
Canon Librarian & Vice-Dean – Peter Doll (canon since 14 March 2009 installation
Canon Precentor – Aidan Platten (since 24 September 2017 installation)
Canon for Mission & Pastoral Care – Andy Bryant (since 29 March 2015 installation)
Canon for Continuing Ministerial Development and Diocesan CMD Officer – Keith James (since 17 October 2015 installation)

Art works and treasures
Norwich Cathedral has a fine selection of 61 misericords, dating from three periods – 1480, 1515 and mid-19th century. The subject matter is varied; mythological, everyday subjects and portraits.

In St Luke's Chapel, behind the altar is a late 14th century painting, known as the Despenser Retable, named after the Bishop of Norwich, Henry le Despenser (1369–1406). During the Peasants' Revolt of 1381, Despenser's forces successfully contained the revolt in Norfolk and the painting was probably commissioned in thanksgiving. Shield in the border of the painting are associated with others who led the attack on the peasants. The retable was re-discovered in 1847, having been reversed and used as a table top.

The copper baptismal font, standing on a moveable base in the nave, was fashioned from bowls previously used for making chocolate in the Norwich Rowntree's factory, and was given to the cathedral after the factory closed in 1994.

Since 2013, the Norfolk Medieval Graffiti Survey (NMGS) has recorded a large amount of medieval graffiti, including organ music inscribed on two four-line staves, on the interior stone surfaces of the cathedral.

Music

Organ and organists
Norwich Cathedral's organ is one the largest in the UK. It was built by local builder Norman and Beard in 1899, but was later damaged in a fire in April 1938. A Cymbelstern with six bells and a rotating star was added to the organ in 1969. In 2017 the dean, the Very Rev Dr Jane Hedges, revealed that the cathedral was planning to spend £2 million on rebuilding the organ and supporting its existing choirs.

The records of all the organists at Norwich Cathedral from 1542, when Thomas Grewe was appointed, have survived. The earliest organist recorded is Adam the Organist, who was employed in 1313. Thomas Wath and John Skarlette are recorded as having played the organ in the 15th century. Notable organists of Norwich Cathedral have included the composers Thomas Morley, Heathcote Dicken Statham, Alfred R. Gaul and Arthur Henry Mann.

Cathedral choirs

Norwich Cathedral's choirs are directed by the Master of the Music, Ashley Grote. The full choir consists of boys, girls and men. There are places for around 20 boys aged from 7 to 13. The choristers attend Norwich School and its Lower School, with at least half of their school fees being paid by the Norwich Cathedral Endowment Fund. Girls were introduced to the choir in 1995. There are places for 24 girls, who are aged from 11 to 18, and are drawn from across Norfolk. They sing evensong once a week (alternately on their own and with the men) and at least one Sunday Eucharist a term.

The choir has 12 men, six of them being choral scholars, the others being professional singers. They sing with the boy choristers at five services a week and often more during special times of year such as Easter and Christmas, and they sing fortnightly with the girls' choir during evensong.

Precinct and gates
The precinct of the cathedral, the limit of the former monastery, is between Tombland (the Anglo-Saxon market place) and the River Wensum and the cathedral close, which runs from Tombland into the cathedral grounds, contains buildings from the 15th through to the 19th century including the remains of an infirmary. The cathedral close is notable for being located within the city's defensive walls and its considerable size, unusual for an urban priory. At  in size it occupied in medieval times one tenth of the total area of the city and includes Almary Green. It is one of the largest in Europe and has more people living within it than any other close.

The grounds also house Norwich School, statues to the Duke of Wellington and Admiral Nelson, and the grave of Edith Cavell.

There are two gates leading into the cathedral grounds, both on Tombland. The Ethelbert Gate takes its name from a Saxon church that stood nearby. The original gate was destroyed in the riot of 1272 and its replacement built in the early 14th century. It has two storeys, the upper originally a chapel dedicated to Saint Ethelbert and decorated with flushwork. In 1420 Thomas Erpingham, benefactor to the city, had the gate which bears his name built, sited opposite the west door of the cathedral leading into the close.

In the arts and popular culture
Norwich Cathedral was used as a location for the 1971 BBC Christmas ghost story The Stalls of Barchester, based on the story by M. R. James.
The cathedral and other churches in the diocese of Norwich were featured in the 1974 BBC documentary A Passion for Churches, presented by the English poet and writer John Betjeman. In 2012, the cathedral and the adjacent Bishop's Palace were featured in the BBC Four documentary The Medieval Mind: How to Build a Cathedral. The cathedral was used as a location for the 2013 film Jack the Giant Slayer. It was featured in the 2016 BBC Four documentary The Search for the Lost Manuscript: Julian of Norwich, and in the 2017 feature film Tulip Fever.  The 'Tombland' volume (2019) of C J Sansom's "Shardlake" series of historical novels is largely set in Norwich, and includes a scene describing alterations made to the cathedral during the Reformation.

See also 
List of cathedrals in the United Kingdom
List of tallest structures built before the 20th century
Architecture of the medieval cathedrals of England
List of the bishops of Norwich
List of Romanesque buildings
List of Gothic Cathedrals in Europe
List of burials at Norwich Cathedral

References

Sources

Further reading

External links

Official website
A history of the choristers of Norwich Cathedral from ofchoristers.net

Norwich Cathedral
Buildings and structures completed in 1145
12th-century church buildings in England
Churches in Norwich
Anglican cathedrals in England
Pre-Reformation Roman Catholic cathedrals
Diocese of Norwich
Tourist attractions in Norwich
Grade I listed cathedrals
Grade I listed churches in Norfolk
English churches with Norman architecture
English Gothic architecture in Norfolk
Church of England church buildings in Norwich
Monasteries in Norfolk
Edward Blore buildings
Anthony Salvin buildings
Basilicas (Church of England)